Warren Jay Cawley (July 6, 1940 – January 21, 2022) was an American athlete, winner of 400 m hurdles at the 1964 Summer Olympics.

Cawley was born in Highland Park, Michigan. He attended Farmington High School.

Cawley still holds the record time for the 100 yard dash at Farmington High School that he set in 1959. He was Track and Field News "High School Athlete of the Year" in 1959.  He won the AAU championships in 440-yard hurdles in 1963 and 1965 and as a University of Southern California student, he won an NCAA title in 440 yd hurdles in 1963.

At the Olympic Trials in 1964, Cawley set a world record in 400 m hurdles with a time of 49.1, thus becoming a main favorite at the Olympic Games. Cawley won the gold medal in Tokyo with a commanding performance in which he beat his nearest competitor John Cooper from Great Britain by 0.5 seconds.

He died on January 21, 2022, at the age of 81.

References

External links
 

1940 births
2022 deaths
American male hurdlers
World record setters in athletics (track and field)
Athletes (track and field) at the 1964 Summer Olympics
Olympic gold medalists for the United States in track and field
People from Highland Park, Michigan
Track and field athletes from Michigan
USC Trojans men's track and field athletes
Medalists at the 1964 Summer Olympics